Olle Erik Cyrus Åkerlund (28 September 1911 – 4 February 1978) was a Swedish sailor. He was a crew member of the Swedish boat Bissbi that won the gold medal in the 6 m class
at the 1932 Summer Olympics. The boat was owned by his father Erik, who was a publisher and entrepreneur.

References

1911 births
1978 deaths
Sportspeople from Gothenburg
Swedish male sailors (sport)
Olympic sailors of Sweden
Olympic gold medalists for Sweden
Olympic medalists in sailing
Medalists at the 1932 Summer Olympics
Sailors at the 1932 Summer Olympics – 6 Metre
Royal Swedish Yacht Club sailors
20th-century Swedish people